Abney Park is a steampunk band based in Seattle. The band is named after an iconic gothic cemetery, the Abney Park Cemetery in London where Robert Brown, the founder of the band, lived and studied for a period in 1988. Formerly a goth band, Abney Park has transformed their look and sound and has been called the "quintessential spokespeople for the steampunk subculture."

History

Early days 
Abney Park is the creative brainchild of Robert Brown, who formed the band in 1997 and continues to be the lead singer, principal songwriter, artistic director, and chief manager of the band. Brown released the first full-length album, Abney Park, in 1998, and in 1999 released Return to the Fire. The band's third album, Cemetery Number 1, drew from their first two albums as well as introducing several new songs. These early albums pioneered steampunk themes prior to the band's adoption of the steampunk label with lyrics depicting clockwork boys and steam-powered dystopian cities (The Change Cage and Twisted and Broken).

In 1998 the Tacoma-based counter culture magazine Pandemonium first labeled Abney Park a goth band, citing their electronic sound and Robert Brown's deep baritone voice. This label stuck, and influenced the band's musical and visual style, which culminated with their 2002 release From Dreams Or Angels. Their songs The Change Cage, Black Day and No Life each reached number one on the industrial, darkwave and black metal music charts.

In 2005, the band released Taxidermy, which is a collection of new versions of songs from past albums, three live tracks, and two covers. In 2006, the release of the album The Death of Tragedy marked the beginning of a major change for the band, as their music departed from a goth/pagan sound to a more world music/fusion sound.

Becoming steampunk 
In early 2005, Robert Brown transformed Abney Park from a largely goth industrial band into a steampunk band. As Brown said on his live journal post March 13, 2005, "[We] seem to be a sort of specialized variation on steampunk, sort of a Victorian sci-fi adventurer, as if we just arrived by jet-powered zeppelin for a midnight dig just outside of Cairo in the 1900s. I'm excited because I feel like for the first time, our appearances are starting to capture the same level of imagination and exotic tones the music and lyrics always have."

As part of that transformation, fictional identities were created for the main performers; e.g., Robert Brown became known as Captain Robert. Since steampunk is largely derived from science fiction and fantasy literature, a fictional backstory was created to set a stage for their new music. According to that story (as told in The Wrath of Fate: Book 1 of The Airship Pirate Chronicles, by Robert Brown), the band's plane collided with a time-travelling dirigible called the HMS Ophelia, said to have been created by a Dr. Leguminous Calgori in a freak storm. The band commandeered the vessel, deciding to become airship pirates, and formed a new band from the surviving members of the crash. Much of their music since that time has been based around this fictional backstory.  "The new, eclectic sound is attributed to the strange instruments and exotic musical influences lifted from the numerous locations and eras they have visited in the airship Ophelia, featuring "clockwork guitars, belly dancers, flintlock bassists, Middle-Eastern percussion, violent violin, and Tesla powered keyboards blazing in a post-apocalyptic, swashbuckling, Steampunk musical mayhem.’

In the spring of 2008, they released Lost Horizons, their first wholly steampunk-themed album, and in 2009, the band released Æther Shanties, their tenth album. A recording of a live performance of their next album, The End of Days, can be found here. Their seventh studio album was released on October 15, 2010.

Popularity 
Now sometimes called the quintessential steampunk band, Abney Park have been featured in major news media and interviewed by several genre magazines and websites, and have been highlighted on MTV and G4TV as primary examples of the steampunk musical scene.

Abney Park have performed at numerous festivals. They were the featured band at the first Steamcon in 2009 and have appeared there numerous times since. They have appeared three times at World Steam Expo, five times at Dragon*Con; also WGW, Utah Dark Arts, Bats Day, Convergence, Ravenwood Festival, Masque and Veil, Queen Mary Pyrate Daze, the Bay Area Maker Faire, and Wild Wild West Steampunk Convention. Internationally, they have made four appearances at Whitby Gothic Weekend in the UK, two appearances at Wave Gotik TReffen in Leipzig, Germany, and four at the Grand Canadian Steampunk Exposition in Ontario Canada. They have been in demand for shows in St Petersberg and Moscow, Russia, Spain, Australia, and the UK.

Their music has featured in many compilation CDs, including Gilded Age Records' An Age Remembered: A Steampunk and Neo-Victorian Mix, Cleopatra Records' The Unquiet Grave vol. III, Sepiachord's A Sepiachord Companion, BLC Productions' Annihilation and Seduction, Squish Me Down Records' Eighteen (Eighteen NW Bands Benefit CD)

Their music has also appeared in several movie soundtracks, including Insomnis Amour, Goth, and Lord of the Vampires. The Abney Park song Sleep Isabella was used in a scene in the HBO series True Blood, Season 5 Episode 4.

Discography 

Albums:

 From Dreams Or Angels (2002)
 Twisted & Broken: Abney Park Remixed (This album is available from the band as part of a special package)
 Taxidermy (2005)
 The Death of Tragedy (2005)

Compilations:
 Building Steam (2014) Live DVD

 The Music Videos + Live From Russia (2015) Live BD/DVD
 Anachronomicon (2016) 5CD collection divided by themeOther songs: Cellophane Wings (It was written even before the earlier days. Furthermore, it wasn't recorded or performed live but these lyrics are part of the Airship Pirates RPG among the other songs)
 Custom Song "Sleep Isabella" (singer Robert Brown offered to rewrite and rerecord the lyrics of this song for a custom version)

Airship Pirates RPG 

In August 2011 Cakebread & Walton, using Cubicle 7 Entertainment as their publisher, released a role playing game based on the world of Abney Park's backstory. Set in the post-apocalyptic world after their album, The End Of Days – a future world with a severely disrupted timeline – Airship Pirates features steampunk themes and Victorian-era style. Airship Pirates places players as air pirates in command of their own steam-powered airships. There they will seek not only to pillage the skies, but to plunder history, possibly causing even greater disruption to the past. Meanwhile, the world below struggles in Victorian-style squalor under an oppressive government that maintains control through clockwork policemen. In December 2011, the RPG game won Diehard GameFAN's "Best Core Rulebook of 2011" award.

Novels 
In 2012, a novel was released entitled The Wrath of Fate: Book 1 of The Airship Pirate Chronicles, by Robert Brown. Set in a post-apocalyptic steampunk future, the book is a companion to Abney Park's music and RPG game, exploring Abney Park's backstory and fictional setting in greater detail. A second novel in the series, Retrograde, came out in 2013, followed by a third novel, "The Toyshop At The End Of The World", in 2015.

See also

References

External links 
 
 

Bands with fictional stage personas
Steampunk music
Musical groups established in 1997
Musical groups from Seattle